Ark (also Romanized as Ārḵ) is a village in Chahardeh Sankhvast Rural District, Jolgeh Sankhvast District, Jajrom County, North Khorasan Province, Iran. At the 2006 census, its population was 263, in 60 families.

References 

Populated places in Jajrom County